Jean-Louis Ezine, real name Jean-Louis Bunel (born 24 September 1948 in Cabourg) is a French writer, journalist and radio host.

Biography 
Born Jean-Louis Bunel by the name of his mother before taking that of his father-in-law at the age of three, Jean-Louis Ezine grew up at Lisieux in Normandy before studying literature and philosophy. While studying in Caen, he made his journalistic debut as a stringer in the weekly Pays d’Auge-Tribune. He left for Paris, performed his military service in 1968/69 in Toulon, then in Fréjus and finally in Djibouti in the naval infantry. He joined the editorial staff of Pif Gadget. In 1972, he became a literary critic for Les Nouvelles littéraires, a journal of which he became editor-in-chief and literary director, and then entered in 1984 at the Nouvel Observateur where he is still working. He also collaborated with the weekly L'Express.

From 8 January 1990, Jean-Louis Ezine held a daily three-minute column on France Culture, taking the form of a humorous and often caustic humor note, in the successive morning programs of the station: Culture matin, Tout arrive !, then La Matinale. On July 19, 2013, he delivered his 5651st and latest chronicle after the decision taken by the radio station to put a halt to the program. Ezine was also a member of the literary program  on France Inter - of which he was a true pillar, and one of the speakers with the most singular tone since the beginning of the 1990s.

In 2011, Ezine was a juror of the prix Françoise Sagan.

Work 
Novels
 1983: La Chantepleure, éditions du Seuil, 
 2003: Un ténébreux, éditions du Seuil, 
 2009: , éditions Gallimard,  — prix Maurice Genevoix and prix Octave-Mirbeau

Collections of texts and interviews
 1981: Les Écrivains sur la sellette (collection of interviews with thirty eight writers), éditions du Seuil  — prix Broquette-Gonin of the Académie française 
 1994: Du train où vont les jours. (collection of columns broadcast in 1994 on France Culture), éditions du Seuil, 
 1994: Propos d'un emmerdeur (conversations with Étiemble), Arléa, 
 1995: Ailleurs (conversations with Jean-Marie Le Clézio), Arléa, 
 1995: Entre nous soit dit (conversations with Philippe Djian), Plon,

References

External links 

 Jean-Louis Ezine on Babelio
 Le blog de Jean-Louis Ezine on Philosophie magazine
 Jean-Louis Ezine Les Taiseux on YouTube 
 La Chronique de Jean-Louis Ezine sur le site de France Culture

1948 births
Living people
People from Cabourg
Writers from Normandy
20th-century French journalists
French literary critics
20th-century French writers
French radio presenters
20th-century French essayists
Winners of the Prix Broquette-Gonin (literature)